The NBA 75th Anniversary Team, also referred to as the NBA 75, was chosen in 2021 to honor the 75th anniversary of the founding of the National Basketball Association (NBA). It was the fourth and most recent anniversary team in the league. Similar to the 50 Greatest Players in NBA History named in 1996, a panel of reporters, current and former players, coaches, general managers, and team executives selected the greatest players in league history. Tasked with compiling a list of 75 players, the committee named an additional 76th member due to a tie in voting. It was built as part of the league's anniversary celebration during the 2021–22 NBA season. Forty-five of the seventy-six players were later assembled in Cleveland, during the halftime ceremony of the 2022 All-Star Game.

Players selected

List
At the time of selection, the players selected combined for 158 NBA championships, 62 Most Valuable Player (MVP) awards, 48 Finals MVP awards, and 730 All-Star selections. Of the 76 players, all 50 members of the 50th anniversary team were selected. The other 26 included players from the 1970s to the current era. Two notable omissions from the earlier top 50 selections, Bob McAdoo and Dominique Wilkins, were named to the 75th anniversary list. When the previous 50 players were chosen in 1996–97, Wilkins was the only nine-time All-Star to be excluded, as well as the only six-time All-NBA selection to miss the cut. A two-time NBA champion, McAdoo was the only former league MVP omitted. Bill Russell, Bob Cousy, George Mikan and Bob Pettit are the only players who have been named to all four NBA anniversary teams. Derrick Rose (2011) was the only former league MVP (as of 2020) to not be included on the team.

Eleven players (Giannis Antetokounmpo, Carmelo Anthony, Stephen Curry, Anthony Davis, Kevin Durant, James Harden, LeBron James, Kawhi Leonard, Damian Lillard, Chris Paul, and Russell Westbrook) were active in the 2021–22 season, when the list was announced. Four of them (Anthony, Davis, James, and Westbrook) were playing for the Los Angeles Lakers on their 2021–22 squad. The Brooklyn Nets, with Durant and Harden on their roster, were the only other team with multiple active players. The Boston Celtics had the most overall players, past and present, on the list with 20. The Lakers were next with 15.

Selection process
The list was made through voting compiled by a panel of 88 media, current and former players, coaches, general managers, and team executives. The NBA stated the players were "selected for being pioneers that have helped shape, define, and redefine the game." The NBA revealed 25 members of the list the first two days, and 26 the last day from October 19 through October 21, 2021.

15 Greatest Coaches in NBA History

Alongside the selection of the NBA's 75th anniversary team was the selection of the 15 Greatest Coaches in NBA History. The list was compiled based upon unranked selection undertaken exclusively by a panel of 43 current and former NBA coaches in collaboration with the National Basketball Coaches Association. Of the 15 coaches, eight members of the Top 10 Coaches in NBA History in 1996 were selected; original Top 10 coaches Bill Fitch and John Kundla were excluded from the updated list. Nine of the 15 coaches named were alive at the time of the list's announcement, and four of them—Steve Kerr, Gregg Popovich, Doc Rivers, and Erik Spoelstra—were active. Six have died: Red Holzman in 1998, Red Auerbach in 2006, Chuck Daly in 2009, Jack Ramsay in 2014, and K. C. Jones and Jerry Sloan in 2020. Nelson and Sloan were the only members to have never won a championship as a coach; Nelson won five as a player. Wilkens was the only member of the coaches list to have been selected as a member of the players list. Ten of the 15 coaches are also members of the Naismith Memorial Basketball Hall of Fame, with Nelson the most recent inductee in 2012.

See also

 ABA All-Time Team
 NBA 25th Anniversary Team
 NBA 35th Anniversary Team
 50 Greatest Players in NBA History

Notes

References

External links
 NBA's 75th Anniversary Team Players at NBA.com
 The Full NBA 75 Team Announced at 2022 All-Star Game at the NBA official YouTube channel

75
75